The Malaysian diaspora are Malaysian emigrants from Malaysia and their descendants that reside in a foreign country. Population estimates vary from seven hundred thousand to one million, both descendants of early emigrants from Malaysia, as well as more recent emigrants from Malaysia. The largest of these foreign communities are in Singapore, Australia, Brunei and the United Kingdom.

Emigration from Malaysia is a complex demographic phenomenon existing for decades and having a number of reasons, with institutional racism being one of the major factors. The process is the reverse of the immigration to Malaysia. Malaysia does not keep track of emigration, and counts of Malaysians abroad are thus only available courtesy of statistics kept by the destination countries. As of 2019, according to the United Nations Department of Economic and Social Affairs, the population of the Malaysian diaspora stands at 1,730,152.

Reasons of emigration
 Economic reasons
 Education opportunities (e.g. study abroad)
 Family reasons (most common with recent immigrants or permanent residents)
 Marriage to a foreigner with a job in the foreign country
 Lack of meritocracy
 Business opportunities 
 Religious reasons
 Political disenchantment/issues 
 Access to health insurance, and other health reasons (see Universal health care)
 Racism
 Evasion of legal liabilities (e.g. crimes, taxes, loans, etc.)

Brain drain
Due to the concept of Ketuanan Melayu (lit. Malay supremacy), a citizen that is not considered to be of Bumiputera status face many roadblocks and discrimination in matters such as economic freedom, education, healthcare and housing. Opposition groups, government critics and human rights observers has labeled the Malaysian situation as being highly similar to apartheid policies due to their status as de facto second-class citizens. Such policies has also led to a significant brain drain from the country.

Citizenship
Malaysians can only lose their citizenship in a very limited number of ways. Anyone born to at least one Malaysian parent is considered to be a Malaysian citizen. It is not automatic for a child born abroad to one Malaysian parent to obtain Malaysian citizenship if the Malaysian parent has been living abroad for a long time.

Malaysians residing overseas who have not registered as a Normal Elector before or who wish to be registered as an Absent Voter to participate in any Malaysian election may register with the respective consulate generals, embassies or high commissioners. As of 2013, only 8,756 Malaysians (1%) out of over 700,000 Malaysians living abroad have registered as postal voters. 6,092 of the 8,756 registered citizens overseas or 69.82% had cast their votes at 100 Malaysian missions worldwide for the Malaysian general election, 2013.

Population by continent
The list below is of the countries with significant Malaysian populations. Those shown first with exact counts are enumerations of Malaysians who have immigrated to those countries and are legally resident there, does not include those who were born there to one or two Malaysian parents, does not necessarily include those born in Malaysia to parents temporarily in Malaysia and moved with parents by right of citizenship rather than immigration, and does not necessarily include temporary expatriates.

Many Malaysians have relatives in Brunei, similar to Singapore, especially amongst ethnic Malays of Bruneian Malay origin residing in southern Sabah, Federal Territory of Labuan as well as northern Sarawak. 
There are approximately 9% Malaysian diaspora in Brunei, mostly expatriates working in the petroleum industry (Brunei Shell Petroleum oil company). Malaysians in India consist of expatriates and international students from Malaysia as well as Indian people of Malaysian descent and most of them are ethnic Malaysians of Indian origin, working as well as studying in the home country of their ancestors. In 2011, an estimated 2,500 Malaysians, mostly working for Malaysian-based companies as well as 2,000 students, reside in India, mainly in South India.

The overseas Malaysian diaspora in Singapore is one of the largest with the number standing at 952,261 in 2019, making them the world's largest Malaysian diaspora community. Many Malaysians in Singapore are usually expatriates, working in various industries of the Singapore economy since its rapid industrialisation in the 1970s. In 2010, according to the World Bank, there are 385,979 Singapore residents of Malaysian origin, including permanent residents and Singaporeans.

At the 2016 Census 138,364 Australian residents stated that they were born in Malaysia. As of 2006 census, there is around 14,547 Malaysian-born people lived in New Zealand.

The Malaysian community in the UK is one of the west's largest, this is mainly due to the influence of the British Empire on Malaysia. The 2001 UK Census recorded 49,886 Malaysian-born people, with September 2009 Office for National Statistics estimates putting the figure at around 63,000.

According to answers provided to an open-ended question included in the 2010 United States Census, 26,179 people said that their ancestry or ethnic origin was Malaysian. The Canada 2006 Census recorded 12 165 people self-identifying as Malaysian Canadian, but only 1 820 of these self-identified as exclusively Malaysian Canadian.

References

External links
 Ministry of Foreign Affairs, Malaysia - Malaysian Mission Overseas
 Overseas Malaysian Communities
 Malaysia Central: Malaysians Abroad: Business, Networking, Community & Friendship Clubs Overseas